Trichouropoda is a genus of mites in the family Trematuridae.

Species
 Trichouropoda abeokutana Hirschmann & Wisniewski, 1987     
 Trichouropoda abercorni Hirschmann & Wisniewski, 1987     
 Trichouropoda aculeata Hirschmann & Wisniewski, 1988     
 Trichouropoda adfixa (Vitzthum, 1921)     
 Trichouropoda adfixasimilis (Hirschmann & Wisniewski, 1986)     
 Trichouropoda adjuncti Wisniewski & Hirschmann, in Hirschmann & Wisniewski 1988     
 Trichouropoda admixta (Vitzthum, 1921)     
 Trichouropoda afossalis Hirschmann & Wisniewski, 1987     
 Trichouropoda afossalisimilis Hirschmann & Wisniewski, 1987     
 Trichouropoda africana Wisniewski, 1980     
 Trichouropoda alascae Hirschmann & Wisniewski, 1987     
 Trichouropoda albertaserrata Hirschmann, 1978     
 Trichouropoda alcachupasi Hiramatsu & Hirschmann, in Hirschmann & Wisniewski 1988     
 Trichouropoda alfkeni (Oudemans, 1903)     
 Trichouropoda altissima Hirschmann, 1978     
 Trichouropoda alveolus (Athias-Binche, 1981)     
 Trichouropoda amicorum Wisniewski & Hirschmann, 1992     
 Trichouropoda amoena Hirschmann, 1972     
 Trichouropoda anthribiphila Wisniewski & Hirschmann, in Hirschmann & Wisniewski 1988     
 Trichouropoda anthropophagorum (Vitzthum, 1921)     
 Trichouropoda aokii Hiramatsu, 1979     
 Trichouropoda argentinae Wisniewski & Hirschmann, 1984     
 Trichouropoda aschantiana Wisniewski & Hirschmann, in Hirschmann & Wisniewski 1988     
 Trichouropoda asionis Hirschmann & Wisniewski, 1988     
 Trichouropoda asoki Sarkar & Sanyal, 1999     
 Trichouropoda astructura Hirschmann & Wisniewski, 1988     
 Trichouropoda atlantica (Vitzthum, 1922)     
 Trichouropoda austroasiatica (Vitzthum, 1921)     
 Trichouropoda azteka (Vitzthum, 1921)     
 Trichouropoda balazyi Wisniewski & Hirschmann, 1992     
 Trichouropoda banaszaki Wisniewski & Hirschmann, in Hirschmann & Wisniewski 1988     
 Trichouropoda bassusi Hirschmann & Wisniewski, 1987     
 Trichouropoda beckwithi Wisniewski, 1980     
 Trichouropoda bellatula Hiramatsu, 1977     
 Trichouropoda bennigseni Wisniewski & Hirschmann, 1984     
 Trichouropoda bifilis (Canestrini, 1888)     
 Trichouropoda bipilis (Vitzthum, 1921)     
 Trichouropoda boliviensis Hirschmann, 1978     
 Trichouropoda bonansai Hirschmann, 1978     
 Trichouropoda brasiliana Wisniewski & Hirschmann, 1992     
 Trichouropoda buettneri Wisniewski & Hirschmann, in Hirschmann & Wisniewski 1988     
 Trichouropoda caenorychodis (Vitzthum, 1921)     
 Trichouropoda caesariata Hiramatsu, 1979     
 Trichouropoda callosa Masan, 1999     
 Trichouropoda campbelli Hirschmann, 1978     
 Trichouropoda campomolendina (Berlese, 1887)     
 Trichouropoda canadainterstructura Hirschmann, 1978     
 Trichouropoda canadaovalis Hirschmann, 1978     
 Trichouropoda canadatuberosa Hirschmann, 1978     
 Trichouropoda canadensis (Berlese, 1904)     
 Trichouropoda castrii Hirschmann, 1972     
 Trichouropoda caucasica Wisniewski & Hirschmann, in Hirschmann & Wisniewski 1988     
 Trichouropoda centauri Wisniewski & Hirschmann, 1984     
 Trichouropoda cepae Hirschmann & Wisniewski, 1987     
 Trichouropoda ceylonensis Hirschmann & Wisniewski, 1988     
 Trichouropoda chiapasa Hirschmann, 1978     
 Trichouropoda chilica Hirschmann & Wisniewski, 1987     
 Trichouropoda chmielewskii Hirschmann & Wisniewski, 1986     
 Trichouropoda cienfuegi Wisniewski & Hirschmann, in Hirschmann & Wisniewski 1988     
 Trichouropoda clatrata Hirschmann & Wisniewski, 1988     
 Trichouropoda cocosensis Hirschmann & Wisniewski, 1988     
 Trichouropoda columbiaovalis Hirschmann, 1978     
 Trichouropoda columbiaserrata Hirschmann, 1978     
 Trichouropoda columbiensis Wisniewski & Hirschmann, 1993     
 Trichouropoda concinna (Trouessart, 1902)     
 Trichouropoda confundibilis (Vitzthum, 1921)     
 Trichouropoda congoensis Hirschmann & Hiramatsu, 1977     
 Trichouropoda coprophila Wisniewski & Hirschmann, in Hirschmann & Wisniewski 1988     
 Trichouropoda costai Hirschmann, 1972     
 Trichouropoda cribricollis Hirschmann & Wisniewski, 1987     
 Trichouropoda cubana Hutu, 1977     
 Trichouropoda curiosa Wisniewski & Hirschmann, in Hirschmann & Wisniewski 1988     
 Trichouropoda curtipilis Wisniewski & Hirschmann, in Hirschmann & Wisniewski 1988     
 Trichouropoda daelei Hirschmann, 1981     
 Trichouropoda davidovae Wisniewski & Hirschmann, 1992     
 Trichouropoda denticulata Hirschmann, 1972     
 Trichouropoda denticulatasimilis Hirschmann & Wisniewski, 1987     
 Trichouropoda derosa (Vitzthum, 1921)     
 Trichouropoda dimidiata Hirschmann & Wisniewski, 1987     
 Trichouropoda ditricha Hirschmann & Wisniewski, 1987     
 Trichouropoda ditrichasimilis Hirschmann & Wisniewski, 1987     
 Trichouropoda dutkai Hirschmann & Wisniewski, 1987     
 Trichouropoda eichleri Hirschmann & Wisniewski, 1987     
 Trichouropoda elegans (Kramer, 1882)     
 Trichouropoda elegantissima Hirschmann, 1978     
 Trichouropoda ellipsoides Hirschmann & Wisniewski, 1988     
 Trichouropoda elliptica Hirschmann & Wisniewski, 1988     
 Trichouropoda endroedyi Hirschmann & Wisniewski, 1986     
 Trichouropoda endroedyioides Hirschmann & Wisniewski, 1986     
 Trichouropoda erevaniana Hirschmann & Wisniewski, 1986     
 Trichouropoda euchaeta Hirschmann & Wisniewski, 1986     
 Trichouropoda eumeandralis Hirschmann & Wisniewski, 1987     
 Trichouropoda faber (Berlese, 1916)     
 Trichouropoda faini Hirschmann & Wisniewski, 1988     
 Trichouropoda falconis Hirschmann & Wisniewski, 1988     
 Trichouropoda febris (Vitzthum, 1926)     
 Trichouropoda fodori Hirschmann & Wisniewski, 1986     
 Trichouropoda fruhstorferi Wisniewski & Hirschmann, in Hirschmann & Wisniewski 1988     
 Trichouropoda fumiakii Hiramatsu, 1978     
 Trichouropoda fungivora Hirschmann, 1978     
 Trichouropoda galapagosensis Hirschmann & Wisniewski, 1988     
 Trichouropoda ghanajavensis Hirschmann & Wisniewski, 1988     
 Trichouropoda gigantea Hirschmann & Wisniewski, 1988     
 Trichouropoda grandjeani Hirschmann, 1972     
 Trichouropoda guanabarae Hirschmann & Wisniewski, 1987     
 Trichouropoda guanophila Hirschmann & Wisniewski, 1988     
 Trichouropoda guatemalensis Hirschmann, 1972     
 Trichouropoda hayashii Hiramatsu, 1979     
 Trichouropoda hejianguoi Ma, 2003     
 Trichouropoda heteromunroi Hirschmann & Wisniewski, 1987     
 Trichouropoda heterotricha Hirschmann & Wisniewski, 1987     
 Trichouropoda hieroglyphica (Berlese, 1916)     
 Trichouropoda hildegardae Wisniewski & Hirschmann, 1984     
 Trichouropoda hiramatsui Hirschmann, in Hirschmann & Wisniewski 1988     
 Trichouropoda hirschmanni Feider & Hutu, 1972     
 Trichouropoda hirsuta Hirschmann, 1972     
 Trichouropoda hisamatsui Hiramatsu, 1979     
 Trichouropoda hispanica Hirschmann & Zirngiebl-Nicol, 1961     
 Trichouropoda hormoceri Hirschmann & Wisniewski, 1986     
 Trichouropoda hypopoides (Berlese, 1888)     
 Trichouropoda iberica Hirschmann & Wisniewski, 1987     
 Trichouropoda indragiriensis Hirschmann & Wisniewski, 1987     
 Trichouropoda interstructura Hirschmann & Zirngiebl-Nicol, 1961     
 Trichouropoda ishiharai Hiramatsu, 1979     
 Trichouropoda israelensis Hirschmann, 1978     
 Trichouropoda jacksonia (Hughes, 1948)     
 Trichouropoda janeti (Berlese, 1904)     
 Trichouropoda javensis (Oudemans, 1901)     
 Trichouropoda jeanneli (André, 1945)     
 Trichouropoda jelineki Wisniewski & Hirschmann, 1993     
 Trichouropoda karacholana Wisniewski & Hirschmann, 1992     
 Trichouropoda karawaiewi (Berlese, 1904)     
 Trichouropoda kaseseensis Hirschmann & Wisniewski, 1986     
 Trichouropoda kaszabi Hirschmann, 1978     
 Trichouropoda kaszabisimilis Hirschmann, 1980     
 Trichouropoda krantzi Hirschmann, 1975     
 Trichouropoda kryptopoda Hirschmann & Wisniewski, 1988     
 Trichouropoda laevis Wisniewski & Hirschmann, 1992     
 Trichouropoda lagenaeformis Hirschmann & Wisniewski, 1988     
 Trichouropoda lagunae Hiramatsu & Hirschmann, in Hirschmann & Wisniewski 1988     
 Trichouropoda lamellosa (Hirschmann, 1972)     
 Trichouropoda latina (Berlese, 1916)     
 Trichouropoda lativentris (Vitzthum, 1926)     
 Trichouropoda laudata Wisniewski & Hirschmann, 1988     
 Trichouropoda leoniana Wisniewski & Hirschmann, in Hirschmann & Wisniewski 1988     
 Trichouropoda levisetosa (Oudemans & Voigts, 1904)     
 Trichouropoda lindquisti Hirschmann, 1978     
 Trichouropoda lindquistisimilis Hirschmann, 1978     
 Trichouropoda linguaeformis Hirschmann & Wisniewski, 1988     
 Trichouropoda livorniana Wisniewski & Hirschmann, in Hirschmann & Wisniewski 1988     
 Trichouropoda loksai Hirschmann, 1972     
 Trichouropoda lokuschusi Hirschmann & Wisniewski, 1988     
 Trichouropoda longiovalis (Hirschmann & Zirngiebl-Nicol, 1961)     
 Trichouropoda longiseta (Berlese, 1888)     
 Trichouropoda longitarsalis Hirschmann, 1972     
 Trichouropoda louellae Hirschmann & Wisniewski, 1988     
 Trichouropoda lukoschusi Hirschmann & Wisniewski, 1988     
 Trichouropoda macrochaeta Feider & Hutu, 1972     
 Trichouropoda macropi (Berlese, 1916)     
 Trichouropoda madagascariensis (Vitzthum, 1921)     
 Trichouropoda maeandralis Hirschmann, 1978     
 Trichouropoda magdalenae Wisniewski & Hirschmann, in Hirschmann & Wisniewski 1988     
 Trichouropoda magnaporula Hirschmann & Wisniewski, 1986     
 Trichouropoda mahunkai Hirschmann & Wisniewski, 1988     
 Trichouropoda malgascensis Hirschmann & Wisniewski, 1986     
 Trichouropoda mallodoni Wisniewski, 1980     
 Trichouropoda manaosiana Hirschmann & Wisniewski, 1986     
 Trichouropoda marginalis Wisniewski & Hirschmann, 1992     
 Trichouropoda martini Hirschmann, 1978     
 Trichouropoda mazatlani Hirschmann, 1978     
 Trichouropoda meandralis Hirschmann, 1978     
 Trichouropoda meixneri Wisniewski & Hirschmann, in Hirschmann & Wisniewski 1988     
 Trichouropoda melitommae Hirschmann & Wisniewski, 1988     
 Trichouropoda meruensis Hirschmann & Wisniewski, 1987     
 Trichouropoda mexicoovalis Hirschmann, 1978     
 Trichouropoda microporosa Wisniewski & Hirschmann, 1992     
 Trichouropoda microtricha Wisniewski & Hirschmann, in Hirschmann & Wisniewski 1988     
 Trichouropoda minuta Wisniewski & Hirschmann, in Hirschmann & Wisniewski 1988     
 Trichouropoda mirabilis Hirschmann, in Hirschmann & Wisniewski 1988     
 Trichouropoda moldavica Hutu, 1972     
 Trichouropoda monserratensis Hirschmann & Wisniewski, 1987     
 Trichouropoda montezumae Hirschmann & Wisniewski, 1987     
 Trichouropoda moseri Hirschmann, 1972     
 Trichouropoda munroi Ryke, 1958     
 Trichouropoda nagasakiensis Hiramatsu, 1979     
 Trichouropoda nartana Wisniewski & Hirschmann, 1992     
 Trichouropoda navicularum Hirschmann & Wisniewski, 1988     
 Trichouropoda neomoseri Hirschmann & Wisniewski, 1987     
 Trichouropoda nigella Hiramatsu, 1976     
 Trichouropoda nigeriana Wisniewski & Hirschmann, in Hirschmann & Wisniewski 1988     
 Trichouropoda nodulosa Wisniewski & Hirschmann, 1992     
 Trichouropoda norimbergensis Hirschmann & Zirngiebl-Nicol, 1969     
 Trichouropoda oblita Hirschmann & Wisniewski, 1987     
 Trichouropoda octopilosa Hiramatsu & Hirschmann, in Hirschmann & Wisniewski 1988     
 Trichouropoda oculata Hirschmann & Wisniewski, 1986     
 Trichouropoda odamiyamaensis Hirschmann & Hiramatsu, in Hirschmann & Wisniewski 1986     
 Trichouropoda ontarioovalis Hirschmann, 1978     
 Trichouropoda oraniensis Hirschmann & Wisniewski, 1988     
 Trichouropoda orbicularis (C.L. Koch, 1839)     
 Trichouropoda orbimexicana Hirschmann, 1978     
 Trichouropoda orszaghi Masan, 1999     
 Trichouropoda orychodioides Wisniewski & Hirschmann, in Hirschmann & Wisniewski 1988     
 Trichouropoda orychodis (Vitzthum, 1921)     
 Trichouropoda oryctophila Hirschmann & Wisniewski, 1988     
 Trichouropoda osiana Hirschmann & Wisniewski, 1987     
 Trichouropoda ovalis (C.L.Koch, 1839)     
 Trichouropoda ovalispatulifera Hirschmann, 1980     
 Trichouropoda ovalistreati Hirschmann, 1980     
 Trichouropoda overlaeti Hirschmann & Wisniewski, 1988     
 Trichouropoda palawanensis Hirschmann & Hiramatsu, 1990     
 Trichouropoda pallida (Ewing, 1909)     
 Trichouropoda papuaeovalis Hirschmann & Wisniewski, 1986     
 Trichouropoda parasítica (Choudhuri & Mukherjee, 1964)     
 Trichouropoda parisiana Hirschmann & Wisniewski, 1987     
 Trichouropoda patavina (G. Canestrini, 1885)     
 Trichouropoda paucistructura Hirschmann & Wisniewski, 1987     
 Trichouropoda pawlowskii Wisniewski & Hirschmann, 1992     
 Trichouropoda pecinaituberosa Hirschmann & Wisniewski, 1987     
 Trichouropoda penicillata Hirschmann & Zirngiebl-Nicol, 1961     
 Trichouropoda perforata (Lombardini, 1928)     
 Trichouropoda perforatoides Wisniewski & Hirschmann, 1993     
 Trichouropoda peritrematalis (Hirschmann, 1972)     
 Trichouropoda perrotunda Hirschmann & Wisniewski, 1988     
 Trichouropoda peruana Wisniewski & Hirschmann, 1992     
 Trichouropoda philippinojavensis Hirschmann & Wisniewski, 1988     
 Trichouropoda pilifera Wisniewski & Hirschmann, 1994     
 Trichouropoda pinevillensis Hirschmann & Wisniewski, 1988     
 Trichouropoda pinicola Hirschmann & Wisniewski, 1986     
 Trichouropoda pityophthori Hirschmann, 1978     
 Trichouropoda plana (Sellnick, 1931)     
 Trichouropoda platygeniaphila Hirschmann & Wisniewski, 1986     
 Trichouropoda plaumanni Hirschmann & Wisniewski, 1988     
 Trichouropoda plutoni Hirschmann & Wisniewski, 1987     
 Trichouropoda pocsi Hirschmann & Wisniewski, 1987     
 Trichouropoda polyctenaphila Hirschmann & Wisniewski, 1986     
 Trichouropoda polygraphi (Vitzthum, 1923)     
 Trichouropoda polypori Hirschmann, 1978     
 Trichouropoda polysetosa Masan, 1999     
 Trichouropoda popoensis Hirschmann & Wisniewski, 1987     
 Trichouropoda porosa Wisniewski & Hirschmann, in Hirschmann & Wisniewski 1988     
 Trichouropoda portugalensis Hirschmann & Wisniewski, 1986     
 Trichouropoda praeacuta (Fox, 1948)     
 Trichouropoda pretseae Hirschmann & Wisniewski, 1986     
 Trichouropoda primitiva Hirschmann & Wisniewski, 1988     
 Trichouropoda promiscus (Vitzthum, 1921)     
 Trichouropoda proteramoceri Wisniewski & Hirschmann, 1993     
 Trichouropoda pseudohildegardae Hirschmann & Wisniewski, 1988     
 Trichouropoda punctatissima (Halbert, 1915)     
 Trichouropoda quadritricha Hirschmann & Wisniewski, 1988     
 Trichouropoda quadritrichasimilis Hirschmann & Wisniewski, 1988     
 Trichouropoda querceti Hirschmann, 1972     
 Trichouropoda quinquemontana Hirschmann & Wisniewski, 1988     
 Trichouropoda rackae Hirschmann, 1975     
 Trichouropoda radiosa Hirschmann & Wisniewski, 1987     
 Trichouropoda rafalskii Wisniewski & Hirschmann, 1984     
 Trichouropoda rarosi Hiramatsu & Hirschmann, in Hirschmann & Wisniewski 1988     
 Trichouropoda reticulata Hirschmann & Wisniewski, 1988     
 Trichouropoda romanica Feider & Hutu, 1972     
 Trichouropoda rotunda Hirschmann & Wisniewski, 1988     
 Trichouropoda ruehmi Hirschmann, 1972     
 Trichouropoda ruehmisimilis Hirschmann & Wisniewski, 1987     
 Trichouropoda rufipennis Hirschmann, 1978     
 Trichouropoda rugosa Hirschmann & Wisniewski, 1987     
 Trichouropoda ruizae Hirschmann & Wisniewski, 1987     
 Trichouropoda sakaii Hiramatsu, 1979     
 Trichouropoda salinasi Hiramatsu & Hirschmann, in Hirschmann & Wisniewski 1988     
 Trichouropoda saltoensis Hirschmann, 1978     
 Trichouropoda santantoniensis Wisniewski & Hirschmann, 1992     
 Trichouropoda saopauli Wisniewski & Hirschmann, 1993     
 Trichouropoda sardensis Hirschmann & Zirngiebl-Nicol, 1961     
 Trichouropoda saturni Wisniewski & Hirschmann, 1980     
 Trichouropoda schreiberi Valle, 1951     
 Trichouropoda sculpturata Wisniewski & Hirschmann, in Hirschmann & Wisniewski 1988     
 Trichouropoda sellnicki Hirschmann & Zirngiebl-Nicol, 1969     
 Trichouropoda sellnickioides Wisniewski & Hirschmann, in Hirschmann & Wisniewski 1988     
 Trichouropoda serrata Hirschmann & Zirngiebl-Nicol, 1961     
 Trichouropoda serratasimilis Hirschmann, 1978     
 Trichouropoda sertarum Hirschmann & Wisniewski, 1987     
 Trichouropoda sertulaeformis Hirschmann & Wisniewski, 1987     
 Trichouropoda shcherbakae Hirschmann, 1972     
 Trichouropoda silesiana Wisniewski & Hirschmann, 1992     
 Trichouropoda similibipilis Hirschmann, 1972     
 Trichouropoda similijavensis Hiramatsu & Hirschmann, 1979     
 Trichouropoda simpla (Fox, 1948)     
 Trichouropoda sociata (Vitzthum, 1923)     
 Trichouropoda solaris Hirschmann, 1972     
 Trichouropoda solarissima Hirschmann, 1978     
 Trichouropoda solmani Wisniewski & Hirschmann, 1992     
 Trichouropoda somersetana Hirschmann & Wisniewski, 1987     
 Trichouropoda spatulifera (Moniez, 1892)     
 Trichouropoda spickaovalis Hirschmann & Wisniewski, 1986     
 Trichouropoda stammeri Hirschmann & Zirngiebl-Nicol, 1969     
 Trichouropoda stammerisimilis Hirschmann, 1978     
 Trichouropoda steirastomae Hirschmann & Wisniewski, 1986     
 Trichouropoda stercoraria Hirschmann & Hiramatsu, 1990     
 Trichouropoda stolinai Wisniewski & Hirschmann, 1992     
 Trichouropoda structura Hirschmann & Zirngiebl-Nicol, 1961     
 Trichouropoda sturmi Hirschmann & Wisniewski, 1987     
 Trichouropoda sturmisimilis Hirschmann & Wisniewski, 1987     
 Trichouropoda sumapazae Hirschmann & Wisniewski, 1987     
 Trichouropoda sumatrensis Hirschmann & Wisniewski, 1986     
 Trichouropoda svatoni Masan, 2001     
 Trichouropoda swietokrzyskii Hirschmann & Wisniewski, 1987     
 Trichouropoda szczecinensis Hirschmann & Wisniewski, 1986     
 Trichouropoda szunyeghyi Hirschmann, 1980     
 Trichouropoda tanzaniae Wisniewski & Hirschmann, 1984     
 Trichouropoda taraxidi Hirschmann & Wisniewski, 1987     
 Trichouropoda tchadensis Wisniewski & Hirschmann, 1993     
 Trichouropoda terrosa (Berlese, 1916)     
 Trichouropoda testudo (Trägårdh, 1908)     
 Trichouropoda tokunoshimaensis Hiramatsu, 1979     
 Trichouropoda tonkini Hirschmann & Wisniewski, 1986     
 Trichouropoda transportabilis (Vitzthum, 1921)     
 Trichouropoda trapezoides Hirschmann & Wisniewski, 1987     
 Trichouropoda treati Hirschmann, 1980     
 Trichouropoda trichomexicana Hirschmann, 1978     
 Trichouropoda tuberculata Hirschmann & Wisniewski, 1988     
 Trichouropoda tuberosa Hirschmann & Zirngiebl-Nicol, 1961     
 Trichouropoda tuberosasimilis Hirschmann & Wisniewski, 1987     
 Trichouropoda tunesiae Hirschmann & Wisniewski, 1988     
 Trichouropoda turbulenta Hirschmann & Wisniewski, 1987     
 Trichouropoda tuvana Wisniewski & Hirschmann, 1992     
 Trichouropoda uroseioides Hirschmann & Wisniewski, 1987     
 Trichouropoda urospinoidea Hirschmann & Zirngiebl-Nicol, 1961     
 Trichouropoda usaramoensis Hirschmann & Wisniewski, 1986     
 Trichouropoda ustkuti Wisniewski & Michalski, 1984     
 Trichouropoda usumburae Wisniewski & Hirschmann, 1984     
 Trichouropoda utahensis Hirschmann & Wisniewski, 1987     
 Trichouropoda utsuki Wisniewski & Michalski, 1984     
 Trichouropoda uvaeformis (Vitzthum, 1921)     
 Trichouropoda uvsnuurensis Wisniewski & Hirschmann, 1992     
 Trichouropoda vanderhammeni Hirschmann & Ztrngiebl-Nicol, 1969     
 Trichouropoda vanna (Lombardini, 1928)     
 Trichouropoda vannaoides Hirschmann, 1978     
 Trichouropoda variseta Wisniewski & Hirschmann, in Hirschmann & Wisniewski 1988     
 Trichouropoda vietnamcamerunis Hirschmann & Wisniewski, 1988     
 Trichouropoda vietnamensis Hirschmann, 1980     
 Trichouropoda vitzthumilongiseta Hirschmann & Wisniewski, 1987     
 Trichouropoda vulpina (Berlese, 1888)     
 Trichouropoda wagneri (Oudemans, 1902)     
 Trichouropoda wakei Hiramatsu, 1979     
 Trichouropoda wilkinsoni Hirschmann & Wisniewski, 1986     
 Trichouropoda woelkei Hirschmann & Wisniewski, 1988     
 Trichouropoda wojtusiaki Hirschmann & Wisniewski, 1987     
 Trichouropoda yamamotoi Hiramatsu & Hirschmann, in Hirschmann & Wisniewski 1988     
 Trichouropoda zairensis Hirschmann & Wisniewski, 1988     
 Trichouropoda zambiae Hirschmann & Wisniewski, 1987     
 Trichouropoda zangi Wisniewski & Hirschmann, in Hirschmann & Wisniewski 1988     
 Trichouropoda zeamays Hirschmann & Wisniewski, 1987     
 Trichouropoda zikani (Sellnick, 1926)     
 Trichouropoda zocchü (Lombardini, 1962)

References

Mesostigmata